Jennifer Smith (born April 10, 1982) is a former American basketball player. She played college basketball at the University of Michigan from 2000 to 2004 and holds the Michigan Wolverines women's basketball single-season scoring record with 659 points during the 2003–04 season.

Early years
Smith was born in 1982 and grew up in DeWitt, Michigan. She played basketball at DeWitt High School, finishing in 2000 with 1,011 career points.  In 1999, she led DeWitt on a 25-game win streak and Michigan's Class B semi-finals. She was inducted into the DeWitt High School Hall of Fame in 2008.

University of Michigan
Smith played for the Michigan Wolverines women's basketball team from 2000 to 2004.  As a senior during the 2003–04 season, Smith scored 659 points, a total that remains Michigan's single-season scoring record. She led the Big Ten Conference with an average of 21.3 points per game as a senior, an average that ranks second best in Michigan history behind Diane Dietz who averaged 21.6 points per game during the 1981–82 season.  She also set the school record for free throws made in a season with 210 during the 2003–04 season.  In all four years at Michigan, Smith scored 1,714 points, a total that is second only to Dietz in the program's history.  She also ranks second to Dietz in single-game scoring.  Smith scored 37 points against Charlotte on December 3, 2003. In 2004, she was honored with the university's M-Zone Award, which recognizes leadership and character, and media voters selected her for the All-Big Ten first team.

Michigan statistics

Source

Professional basketball
Smith played one season in the WNBA for the New York Liberty.  She also played professional basketball for the Good Angels in Slovakia.

References 

1982 births
Living people
American expatriate basketball people in Slovakia
American women's basketball players
Basketball players from Michigan
Centers (basketball)
Michigan Wolverines women's basketball players
New York Liberty players
People from DeWitt, Michigan